Face Tomorrow is a 7" EP/MCD recorded by Hardcore band Mouthpiece in 1995 and released on New Age Records.

Track listing
 With This Regret
 Face Tomorrow
 Cinder
 Left of You

Promo copies
Promo copies came in a special paper sleeve and with a "promo only" note on the CD. Track #5 (uncredited on the sleeve) is just several minutes of 'noise'.

1995 EPs
Mouthpiece (band) albums